Hattush may refer to:

Hattush or Hattusa, the ancient Hittite capital (in Turkey)
Hattush, mentioned in Ezra 8 in the Hebrew Bible, one of the exiles who returned to Jerusalem with Ezra